Dianne Marie Bonifacio Romana-Ahmee (born November 13, 1984) or better known as Dimples Romana is a Filipino actress.

Career
Romana finished at International Hospitality Management Major in Culinary Arts at Enderun College after she finished her studies, Romana's first appearance on TV was via Esperanza in 1997; and after which she became one of the stars of the ABS-CBN series, Tabing Ilog in 1999. Romana, who was taking up BS Tourism in University of Santo Tomas (UST) College of Education, was the courtside reporter on games involving the UST Growling Tigers on the 2002 season of ABS-CBN's coverage of the UAAP men's basketball tournament.

In 2005, she was cast on ABS-CBN's Ang Panday. In 2009, Romana starred in the television series Only You.

In 2005, she was in Dubai. The next year she starred in Pacquiao: The Movie and the horror film, Wag Kang Lilingon. Romana also starred in 2007's One More Chance.

In 2008, she once again co-starred in the Star Cinema's film When Love Begins. She was cast in the film Love Me Again.

In 2010, Romana played Criselda Barrameda in the series Agua Bendita.

In later 2010–2011, she was in the remake version of Mara Clara as Alvira Del Valle. Her character name was renamed from Almira to Alvira, which was first portrayed by Beverly Vergel.

In 2019, she gained mainstream recognition as Daniella Mondragon-Bartolome in the afternoon drama series Kadenang Ginto. A still photo of Romana's character flamboyantly strolling with a briefcase later became the subject of an internet meme, spawning numerous photoshopped images of the Daniela character being depicted as traveling to different places and fictional universes. Romana would later parody her role in a number of commercials and guest appearances, and was named an ambassador for the Department of Tourism.

Personal life 
Romana was married to Romeo Adecer Ahmee Jr. last 2004 and they had their children named Callie and Alonzo respectively. And on June 24, 2022, they welcome their third child named Elio.

Filmography

Television

Film

Awards and nominations

References

External links

1984 births
Living people
Star Magic
People from Parañaque
Actresses from Metro Manila
University of Santo Tomas alumni
ABS-CBN personalities
TV5 (Philippine TV network) personalities
Filipino women comedians